Almeron is a given name. Notable people with the name include:

Almeron Marks (1804–1853), American politician who represented Greene County in the 70th New York State Legislature
Almeron Eager (1838–1902), American farmer and politician from Wisconsin

See also

Almaron Dickinson (1800–1836), an American soldier killed in the Battle of the Alamo